The League of Gentlemen is an album by Robert Fripp. The music on the album was performed by members of a band which toured Europe and North America throughout 1980 under the name of the League of Gentlemen. The album was released in the UK in 1981 in vinyl format on the Editions EG label. The original album has never been reissued in full on CD, however some tracks are on the abridged Robert Fripp and the League of Gentlemen God Save the King CD release.

Touring
The album sleevenotes state that the League of Gentlemen played a total of 77 gigs during 1980 and includes a full list of all these gigs starting at Moles, Bath on 10 April 1980 and finishing at the School of Economics, London on 29 November 1980.

The tour was split into three discernible parts;
 Part 1: 10 April to 1 June – UK and Europe
 Part 2: 14 June to 22 July – North America
 Part 3: 10 September to 29 November – UK

Drummer Jonny Toobad left the band during Part 3 of the tour in Manchester on 22 November and was replaced for the remaining dates by Kevin Wilkinson.

Recording and release
The album was recorded in several sessions, featuring either Jonny Toobad and then Kevin Wilkinson on drums.

The album was then released in February 1981 in the UK, Japan, France and the US as well as Germany and Italy.

Production
The album was produced by Fripp and engineered by Tony Arnold at 'Arny's Shack' studio in Parkstone, Dorset, England.

Track listing
All the tracks are titled in upper case on the album sleeve and on the record label itself. Roman numerals are used for each side and for all part numbering of tracks.

Side I (EGED 9A)
"INDISCREET I" (1.47)
"INDUCTIVE RESONANCE" (4.35)†
"MINOR MAN" (3.45)†
"HEPTAPARAPARSHINOKH" (2.03)†
"DISLOCATED" (4.35)†
"PARETO OPTIMUM I" (2.07)
"EYE NEEDLES" (3.12)†
"INDISCREET II" (2.35)

Side II (EGED 9B)
"PARETO OPTIMUM II" (1.27)
"COGNITIVE DISSONANCE" (3.38)†
"HG WELLS" (3.25)†
"TRAP" (4.45)†
"OCHRE" (3.07)
"INDISCREET III" (1.26)

The run-out groove on this side bears the message "THE NEXT STEP IS DISCIPLINE" – this was a reference to Fripp's next project which was a new band called Discipline. The band was announced in the British music press and they played some gigs and started recording before Robert Fripp, as he later reported to journalists, was driving home, listening to a tape of the new band, and found "..the presence of King Crimson sitting next to me..." So Discipline became the new incarnation of King Crimson, while Discipline remained as the album title only.

Artists/contributors
All songs above are credited as being by Robert Fripp except those marked † which are credited as being by 'The League of Gentlemen'.

The primary performances on the album are credited to;
Barry Andrews - organ
Robert Fripp - guitar
Sara Lee - bass guitar
Jonny Toobad (Johnny Elichaoff) - drums (on HEPTAPARAPARSHINOKH and DISLOCATED)
Kevin Wilkinson - drums (all other tracks)

Also credited are;
Danielle Dax (courtesy of the Lemon Kittens) – for vocals and lyrics ("Hamsprachtmuzic") on the track 'MINOR MAN' and for the album sleeve front cover.
J.G.Bennett (courtesy of Elizabeth Bennett) – for "Extracts from the Sherborne House talks" – vocal samples used at various points on the album.
Marjori – for the Photo of the League taken at Gramercy Park, New York, during July 1980 which appears on the reverse of the album sleeve.
Rob O'Connor – for "Cover Glue".
Paddy Spinks – for "Strategic Interaction".

In addition Robert Christgau claims to recognise uncredited 'spoken overlays' (or samples as we would now call them) by Karen Durbin, Chip Stern, Terre Roche, Richard Goldstein and Ellen Willis but does not state who he thinks is responsible for any specific instance.

Spoken overlays/'indiscretions'
The various uncredited spoken overlays on the album occur mainly on the tracks INDISCREET I, II and III. The compilation of these 'indiscretions' is credited to Robert Fripp.

They may be classified by their location in the running order of the album, the distinct voices heard and the following opening phrases or sounds;

INDISCREET I
"This is addressed to people who have the intention to work" – Voice 1
"Rock and roll is about fucking" – Voice 2 and Voice 3
"That is the possibility that we should explore" – Voice 1
"Can you tell me about your first experience of a nuclear explosion" – Voice 4
- Sound of female groaning (evoking orgasmic ecstasy) –
- Sound of air-raid siren followed by applause –
"There are people who want to know more" – Voice 1
"This is not a record which is out to showcase a guitar player" – Voice 5
"How do I dance to this music?" – Voice 2 and Voice 3
"Then what am I to do about it?" – Voice 1
"Don't dance with your feet" – Voice 2 and Voice 6
INDISCREET II
Features more of the above with emphasis on Voices 2 and 3 extemporising on the subject of rock music. Also included is the complete non-sequitur "I'd like to spend about 100m a year on sewers" and the observation "This country's going down the well" probably sampled from TV or radio. Voice 5 also gets an airing on the subject of Charlie Christian's guitar sound.
COGNITIVE DISSONANCE
Features extended excerpts about change from J.G. Bennett's 1972 lecture entitled "Concern for the Future".
INDISCREET III
Features a number of clips of Voice 5 criticising the League of Gentlemen's music and making unfavourable comparisons with a Talking Heads record and a live performance by Television. These comments are interspersed with samples from TV and radio presumably chosen to signify that the opinions of Voice 5 are held to be of questionable value, e.g. "Why should we put up with this nonsense" and "I think it stinks".
Key to voices:
Voice 1: J.G.Bennett
Voice 2: Terre Roche
Voice 3: Maggie Roche
Voice 4: Sue Lawley (taken from the programme Nationwide)
Voice 5: Unknown Male
Voice 6: Unknown Female

Music reviewer Robert Christgau claims to recognise the voices of the following people: Karen Durbin, Chip Stern, Terre Roche, Richard Goldstein and Ellen Willis

References

Robert Fripp albums
1981 albums
New wave albums by English artists
E.G. Records albums